James Alexander Allan (10 May 1879 – 22 January 1967) was an Australian poet and local historian.

Allan was born in Melbourne. He studied at Alfred Crescent State School, North Fitzroy and the Model School. Between 1912 and 1918 he worked as a Commonwealth Public Servant, and again from 1942 to 1950.

Bibliography
A Wineshop Madonna (1911; verse)
The Old Model School (1934)
Revolution (1940; verse)
Men And Manners In Australia (1945)
The History Of Camberwell (1949)

References

External links
 Photograph at the National Library of Australia: B&W, 19??, nla.pic-an22563690

1879 births
1967 deaths
Poets from Melbourne
Public servants from Melbourne
Australian public servants